Angraecum pyriforme is a species of plant in the family Orchidaceae. It is found in western tropical Africa, to be precise in Cameroon, Ivory Coast, and Nigeria. Its natural habitat is subtropical or tropical moist montane forests. It is threatened by habitat loss.

References 

Vulnerable plants
pyriforme
Orchids of Cameroon
Orchids of Nigeria
Flora of Ivory Coast
Taxonomy articles created by Polbot